S400 may refer to :
 S-400 missile system, a Russian anti-aircraft weapon system 
 S400 (rocket engine), an ArianeGroup rocket engine 
 Canon S400, a camera
 PV-S400 Plus, a Casio Pocket Viewer
 S400, or FireWire 400 computer port
 Mercedes-Benz S400 BlueHYBRID, a car

See also